Aquis Submersus (Latin for Drowned in the Waters) is a painting by the German dadaist and surrealist Max Ernst created in 1919. Influenced by the Italian metaphysical art it is one of Ernst's earliest works showing surrealistic accents. It currently resides at the Städel Museum in Frankfurt, Germany.

The painting depicts a swimming pool surrounded by buildings. The sense of dimension is unclear. The features of the buildings appear to be hand-drawn. The buildings leave shadows against the sky like a wall. Hanging in the sky is a clock that reflects on the water as a moon. In the pool, the picture shows a possibly female or childish body in an upside-down position with only the waist and legs above the water level. The person appears to be diving or is drowning. In the foreground is an armless statue-like figure that appears to have been made out of clay, throwing a shadow in the direction of the pool, similar to another shadow originating from outside the picture. The person looks away from the pool and bears a handlebar mustache resembling that of Ernst's father, but also has features which could be interpreted as female.
 
The painting carries the same name as a famous novella  by Theodor Storm, published in 1876, which influenced Ernst creating his painting.

References

Sources
 The Guardian – Analysis of Pietà or Revolution by Night that describes Ernst's father.

Paintings by Max Ernst
Surrealist paintings
1919 paintings
Paintings in the collection of the Städel
Swimming pools
Bathing in art